Children of Wonder is an anthology of science fiction and fantasy stories edited by William Tenn, published in hardcover by Simon & Schuster in 1953. It was reprinted in paperback in 1954 by Permabooks, under the title Outsiders: Children of Wonder. The only anthology edited by Tenn, its stories feature children with superhuman or supernatural talents.

Contents
 "Introduction", William Tenn
 "The Rocking-Horse Winner", D. H. Lawrence (The Ghost Book 1926)
 "The Words of Guru", Cyril M. Kornbluth (Stirring Science Stories 1941)
 "Baby Is Three", Theodore Sturgeon (Galaxy 1952)
 "The Small Assassin", Ray Bradbury (Dime Mystery Magazine 1946)
 "The Story of a Panic", E. M. Forster (Independent Review 1904)
 "The Piper’s Son", Henry Kuttner & C. L. Moore (Astounding 1945)
 "Miriam", Truman Capote (Mademoiselle 1945)
 "Adam and Eve and Pinch Me", A. E. Coppard (Adam and Eve and Pinch Me 1921)
 "Child’s Play", Alice Mary Schnirring (Weird Tales 1942)
 "The Open Window", Saki (Westminster Gazette 1911)
 "The End of the Party", Graham Greene (London Mercury 1932)
 "The Idol of the Flies", Jane Rice (Unknown 1942)
 "That Only a Mother", Judith Merril (Astounding 1948)
 "Born of Man and Woman", Richard Matheson (F&SF 1950)
 "Keyhole", Murray Leinster (Thrilling Wonder Stories 1951)
 "Terminal Quest", Poul Anderson (Super Science Stories 1951)
 "The Origin of the Species", Katherine MacLean (original)
 "In Hiding", Wilmar H. Shiras (Astounding 1948)
 "The Hatchery," Aldous Huxley (Brave New World 1932)
 "Errand Boy," William Tenn (Astounding 1947)
 "Nightmare for Future Reference", Stephen Vincent Benét (Scholastic 1938)

"The Words of Guru" originally carried the "Kenneth Falconer" byline. "The Piper's Son" originally carried the "Lewis Padgett" byline.

Reception
P. Schuyler Miller reviewed the anthology favorably in Astounding'', saying it included "both top-notch stories and good but routine items, fairly representative of the field."

References

Science fiction anthologies
1953 anthologies
Works by William Tenn